Devasthal   is a village development committee in Salyan District in the Rapti Zone of western-central Nepal. At the time of the 1991 Nepal census it had a population of 2940 people living in 496 individual households.

References

External links
UN map of the municipalities of Salyan District

Populated places in Salyan District, Nepal